The 2018–19 Armenian First League season was the 27th since its establishment. The season was launched on August 6, 2018, and concluded on June 13, 2019. Although Junior Sevan were reigned as champions, however, they did not gain promotion to the 2019–20 Armenian Premier League, due to not meeting the requirements of the Football Federation of Armenia to take part at the Armenian Premier League competition. Instead, runners-up Yerevan gained promotion, as they met the above-mentioned requirements.

Team changes
5 new teams have joined the 2018–19 Armenian First League season:
FC Yerevan from Yerevan, existed between 1995 and 1999, re-founded in 2018.
FC Lokomotiv Yerevan from Yerevan, existed between 2002 and 2005, re-founded in 2018.
Junior Sevan FC from Sevan, a newly-founded club in 2018.
Banants-3 from Yerevan, formed in 2018 as the 3rd team of FC Banants.
Ararat-Armenia-2 from Yerevan, formed in 2018 as the reserve team of FC Ararat-Armenia.

Promoted to 2018–19 Armenian Premier League:
Lori FC as 2017–18 Armenian First League champions.
Artsakh FC as 2017–18 Armenian First League runners-up.
FC Ararat-Armenia as 2017–18 Armenian First League 3rd-place winners.

Summary
A total of 12 clubs have entered the competition with only 4 clubs -Erebuni, Lokomotiv Yerevan, Junior Sevan and  Yerevan- being eligible for promotion, while the rest 8 teams were the reserve teams of clubs from the Armenian Premier League. 

On 28 February 2019, the FFA suspended the rights of Erebuni SC to continue competing in the second part of the 2018-19 Armenian First League and the club was expelled from the competition, plus a fine of AMD 500,000. Their matches of the second part of the season were given to their opponents by 0–3.

Although Junior Sevan were reigned as champions, however, they did not gain promotion to the 2019–20 Armenian Premier League, due to not meeting the requirements of the Football Federation of Armenia to take part at the Armenian Premier League competition. Instead, runners-up Yerevan gained promotion, as they met the requirements.

Stadiums and locations
12 teams will take part in this season's competition, of which only 4 teams -Yerevan, FC Lokomotiv Yerevan, Junior Sevan, and Erebuni- are eligible to get the promotion right to the 2019–20 Armenian Premier League by the end of the competition. The remaining 8 teams are the reserve teams of the football clubs currently participating in the Armenian Premier League competition.

 1Junior Sevan will play at the Dzoraghbyur Training Centre, Dzoraghbyur, due to the ongoing construction of their new home venue Sevan Football Stadium, Sevan.
 2Yerevan will play at the Vagharshapat Football Academy, Vagharshapat, instead of their original venue Yerevan Football Academy Stadium, Yerevan.

Personnel and sponsorship

1. On the back of the shirt.
2. Left the team at the end of the 1st half of the season (after matchday 18).

League table

Season statistics

Top scorers

Notes

References

External links

Armenian First League seasons
2018–19 in Armenian football
Armenia